Fortress 2 may refer to:

 Fortress 2: Re-Entry, a 2000 film by Geoff Murphy
 Fortress 2 (video game), a 1999 South Korean video game
 Fortress 2, American action film starring Bruce Willis